Maria Păduraru (born 5 October 1970 in Negreşti) is a Romanian rower.

References 
 
 

1970 births
Living people
People from Negrești
Romanian female rowers
Rowers at the 1992 Summer Olympics
Olympic silver medalists for Romania
Olympic rowers of Romania
Olympic medalists in rowing
World Rowing Championships medalists for Romania
Medalists at the 1992 Summer Olympics